First Methodist Episcopal Church of St. Johnsville, also known as the United Methodist Church of St. Johnsville, is a historic Methodist Episcopal church located at St. Johnsville, Montgomery County, New York.  The church was built in 1879, and is a one-story, Gothic Revival style brick building over a limestone block foundation.  It has a slate gable roof and features a corner entrance tower and arched openings. The associated church parsonage or Lewis Snell House, was built in 1866.  It is a 1 1/2-story, Italianate style brick dwelling with a low pitched hipped roof.

It was added to the National Register of Historic Places in 2013.

References

Methodist churches in New York (state)
Churches on the National Register of Historic Places in New York (state)
Italianate architecture in New York (state)
Gothic Revival church buildings in New York (state)
Houses completed in 1866
Churches completed in 1879
Buildings and structures in Montgomery County, New York
National Register of Historic Places in Montgomery County, New York
Italianate church buildings in the United States